The Late Bronze Age collapse was a time of widespread societal collapse during the 12th century BC, between c. 1200 and 1150. The collapse affected a large area of the Eastern Mediterranean (North Africa and Southeast Europe) and the Near East, in particular Egypt, eastern Libya, the Balkans, the Aegean, Anatolia, and the Caucasus. It was sudden, violent, and culturally disruptive for many Bronze Age civilizations, and it brought a sharp economic decline to regional powers, notably ushering in the Greek Dark Ages.

The palace economy of Mycenaean Greece, the Aegean region, and Anatolia that characterized the Late Bronze Age disintegrated, transforming into the small isolated village cultures of the Greek Dark Ages, which lasted from around 1100 to the beginning of the better-known Archaic age around 750 BC. The Hittite Empire of Anatolia and the Levant collapsed, while states such as the Middle Assyrian Empire in Mesopotamia and the New Kingdom of Egypt survived but were weakened. Conversely, some peoples such as the Phoenicians enjoyed increased autonomy and power with the waning military presence of Egypt and Assyria in West Asia.

The reason why the arbitrary date 1200 BC acts as the beginning of the end of the Late Bronze Age goes back to one German historian, Arnold Hermann Ludwig Heeren. In one of his histories on ancient Greece from 1817, Heeren stated that the first period of Greek prehistory ended around 1200 BC, basing this date on the fall of Troy at 1190 after ten years of war. He then went on in 1826 to date the end of the Egyptian 19th Dynasty as well to around 1200 BC. Throughout the remainder of the 19th century A.D. other events were then subsumed into the year 1200 BC including the invasion of the Sea Peoples, the Dorian invasion, the fall of Mycenaean Greece, and eventually in 1896 the first mention of Israel in the southern Levant recorded on the Merneptah Stele.

Competing theories of the cause of the Late Bronze Age collapse have been proposed since the 19th century most involving the violent destruction of cities and towns. These include volcanic eruptions, droughts, disease, earthquakes, storms, invasions by the Sea Peoples or migrations of the Dorians, economic disruptions due to increased ironworking, and changes in military technology and methods that brought the decline of chariot warfare. However, recent research suggests that earthquakes were not as impactful as previously believed. Following the collapse, gradual changes in metallurgic technology led to the subsequent Iron Age across Eurasia and Africa during the 1st millennium BC.

Collapse 
 
The deterioration of these governments interrupted trade routes and led to severely reduced literacy in much of this area.

Initially historians believed that in the first phase of this period, almost every city between Pylos and Gaza was violently destroyed, and many were abandoned, including Hattusa, Mycenae, and Ugarit, with Robert Drews claiming that, "Within a period of forty to fifty years at the end of the thirteenth and the beginning of the twelfth century, almost every significant city in the eastern Mediterranean world was destroyed, many of them never to be occupied again." But more recent research has shown this was a faulty argument since Drews wildly over estimated the amount of cities that were destroyed and often made up destructions that never happened. According to Millek, "If one goes through archaeological literature from the past 150 years, there are 148 sites with 153 destruction events ascribed to the end of the Late Bronze Age ca. 1200 BCE. However, of these, 94, or 61%, have either been misdated, assumed based on little evidence, or simply never happened at all. For Drews’s map, and his subsequent discussion of some other sites which he believed were destroyed ca. 1200 BCE, of the 60 “destructions” 31, or 52%, are false destructions. The complete list of false destructions includes other notable sites such as: Lefkandi, Orchomenos, Athens, Knossos, Alassa, Carchemish, Aleppo, Alalakh, Hama, Qatna, Kadesh, Tell Tweini, Byblos, Tyre, Sidon, Ashdod, Ashkelon, Beth-Shean, Tell Dier Alla, and many more."Only a few powerful states survived the Bronze Age collapse, particularly Assyria (albeit temporarily weakened), the New Kingdom of Egypt (also weakened), the Phoenician city-states and Elam. Even among these comparative survivors, success was mixed. By the end of the 12th century, Elam waned after its defeat by Nebuchadnezzar I, who briefly revived Babylonian fortunes before suffering a series of defeats by the Assyrians. After the death of Ashur-bel-kala in 1056, Assyria declined for a century. Its empire shrank significantly by 1020 BCE, apparently leaving it in control only of the areas in its immediate vicinity, although its heartland remained well-defended. By the time of Wenamun, Phoenicia had regained independence from Egypt.

Robert Drews describes the collapse as "arguably the worst disaster in ancient history, even more calamitous than the collapse of the Western Roman Empire". Cultural memories of the disaster told of a "lost golden age". For example, Hesiod spoke of Ages of Gold, Silver, and Bronze, separated from the cruel modern Age of Iron by the Age of Heroes. Rodney Castleden suggests that memories of the Bronze Age collapse influenced Plato's story of Atlantis[23] in Timaeus and the Critias.

Various explanations for the collapse have been proposed, including climatic changes (such as drought or effects of volcanic eruptions), invasions by groups such as the Sea Peoples, effects of the spread of iron metallurgy, developments in military weapons and tactics, and a variety of failures of political, social and economic systems, but none has achieved consensus. More than one of these factors probably played a part.

Recovery

Gradually, by the end of the ensuing Dark Age, remnants of the Hittites coalesced into small Syro-Hittite states in Cilicia and in the Levant, where the new states were composed of mixed Hittite and Aramean polities. Beginning in the mid-10th century BC, a series of small Aramean kingdoms formed in the Levant, and the Philistines settled in southern Canaan, where Canaanite speakers had coalesced into a number of polities such as Israel, Moab, Edom and Ammon.

Regional evidence

Evidence of destruction

Anatolia
 
Before the Bronze Age collapse, Anatolia (Asia Minor) was dominated by a number of peoples of varying ethno-linguistic origins, including: Semitic-speaking Assyrians and Amorites, Hurro-Urartian-speaking Hurrians, Kaskians and Hattians, and later-arriving Indo-European peoples such as the Luwians, Hittites, Mitanni, and Mycenaeans.

From the 16th century BC, the Mitanni, a migratory minority speaking an Indo-Aryan language, formed a ruling class over the Hurrians. Similarly, the Indo-European-speaking Hittites absorbed the Hattians, a people speaking a language that may have been of the non-Indo-European North Caucasian languages or a language isolate.

Every Anatolian site, apart from integral Assyrian regions in the southeast and regions in eastern, central and southern Anatolia under the control of the powerful Middle Assyrian Empire (1392–1050) that was important during the preceding Late Bronze Age, shows a destruction layer and it appears that in these regions civilization did not recover to the level of the Assyrians and Hittites for another thousand years or so. The Hittites, already weakened by a series of military defeats and annexations of their territory by the Middle Assyrian Empire, which had already destroyed the Hurrian-Mitanni Empire, it was initially assumed that they then suffered a coup de grâce when Hattusa, the Hittite capital, was burned, probably by the Kaskians, long indigenous to the southern shores of the Black Sea, possibly aided by the incoming Indo-European-speaking Phrygians. However, Jürgen Seeher, the former lead excavator at Hattusa, has demonstrated that the city was not completely destroyed in a catastrophic assault. He states that:1) There is no burnt 'horizon', only a certain number of burnt ruins the date of whose destruction is not established; 2) for the most part these burnt ruins contained no finds, which suggests that they burnt down only after they had lost their function and had been emptied of artefacts; 3) the emptying was presumably carried out by inhabitants of the city  – after all, an enemy that is attacking a city does not go to the trouble of emptying buildings virtually down to the last pot before torching them; 4) the only buildings to have burnt are official ones – temples,  palace buildings – while the residential districts remained unscathed; this too argues against an assault from outside.Karaoğlan, near present-day Ankara, was burned and the corpses left unburied. Many other sites that were not destroyed were abandoned. The Luwian city of Troy, famed site of the Trojan War, was destroyed at least twice in this period, before being abandoned until Roman times.

The Phrygians had arrived, probably through the Bosporus or over the Caucasus Mountains, in the 13th century, before being first stopped by the Assyrians and then conquered by them in the Early Iron Age of the 12th century. Other groups of Indo-European peoples followed the Phrygians into the region, most prominently the Dorians and Lydians, and in the centuries after the period of Bronze Age Collapse, Cimmerians and the Iranian-speaking Scythians also appeared. Semitic-speaking Arameans and Kartvelian-speaking Colchians, and revived Hurrian polities, particularly Urartu, Nairi and Shupria, also emerged in parts of the region and Transcaucasia. The Assyrians continued their extant policies, conquering the new peoples and polities they came into contact with, as they had with the preceding polities of the region. However, Assyria gradually withdrew from much of the region for a time in the second half of the 11th century, although they continued to campaign militarily at times, in order to protect their borders and keep trade routes open, until a renewed vigorous period of expansion in the late 10th century.

These sites in Anatolia show evidence of the collapse:
 Troy
 Miletus
 Hattusa
 Mersin
 Tarḫuntašša

Cyprus

During the reign of the Hittite king Tudḫaliya IV (reigned c. 1237–1209), the island was briefly invaded by the Hittites, either to secure the copper resource or as a way of preventing piracy. Shortly afterwards, the island was reconquered by his son Suppiluliuma II around 1200.

There is little evidence of destruction on the island of Cyprus in the years surrounding 1200 which marks the separation between the Late Cypriot II (LCII) from the LCIII period. The city of Kition is commonly cited as destroyed at the end of the LC IIC, but the excavator, Vassos Karageorghis, made it expressly clear that it was not destroyed stating, "At Kition, major rebuilding was carried out in both excavated Areas I and II, but there is no evidence of violent destruction; on the contrary, we observe a cultural continuity." Jesse Millek has demonstrated that while it is possible that the city of Enkomi was destroyed, the archaeological evidence is not clear. Of the two buildings dating to the end of the LC IIC excavated at Enkomi, both had limited evidence of burning and most rooms were without any kind of damage. The same can be said for the site of Sinda as it is not clear if it was destroyed since only some ash was found but no other evidence that the city was destroyed like fallen walls or burnt rubble. The only settlement on Cyprus that has clear evidence it was destroyed around 1200 was Maa Palaeokastro which was likely destroyed by some sort of attack though the excavators were not sure who attacked it saying, "We might suggest that [the attackers] were ‘pirates’, ‘adventurers’ or remnants of the ‘Sea Peoples’, but this is simply another way of saying that we do not know."

Several settlements on Cyprus were abandoned at the end of the LC IIC or during the first half of the 12th century without destruction such as Pyla Kokkinokremmos, Toumba tou Skourou, Alassa, and Maroni-Vournes. In a trend which appears to go against much of the Eastern Mediterranean at this time, several areas of Cyprus, Kition and Paphos, appear to have flourished after 1200 during the LC IIIA rather than experiencing any sort of downturn.

Syria

Ancient Syria had been initially dominated by a number of indigenous Semitic-speaking peoples. The East Semitic-speaking polities of Ebla and the Akkadian Empire and the Northwest Semitic-speaking Amorites ("Amurru") and the people of Ugarit were prominent among them. Syria during this time was known as "The land of the Amurru".

Before and during the Bronze Age Collapse, Syria became a battleground between the Hittites, the Middle Assyrian Empire, the Mitanni and the New Kingdom of Egypt between the 15th and late 13th centuries BC, with the Assyrians destroying the Hurri-Mitanni empire and annexing much of the Hittite empire. The Egyptian empire had withdrawn from the region after failing to overcome the Hittites and being fearful of the ever-growing Assyrian might, leaving much of the region under Assyrian control until the late 11th century. Later the coastal regions came under attack from the Sea Peoples. During this period, from the 12th century, the incoming Northwest Semitic-speaking Arameans came to demographic prominence in Syria, the region outside of the Canaanite-speaking Phoenician coastal areas eventually came to speak Aramaic and the region came to be known as Aramea and Eber Nari.

The Babylonians belatedly attempted to gain a foothold in the region during their brief revival under Nebuchadnezzar I in the 12th century, but they too were overcome by their Assyrian neighbors. The modern term "Syria" is a later Indo-European corruption of "Assyria", which only became formally applied to the Levant during the Seleucid Empire (323–150 BC) (see Etymology of Syria).

Levantine sites previously showed evidence of trade links with Mesopotamia (Sumer, Akkad, Assyria and Babylonia), Anatolia (Hattia, Hurria, Luwia and later the Hittites), Egypt and the Aegean in the Late Bronze Age. Evidence at Ugarit shows that the destruction there occurred after the reign of Merneptah (r. 1213–1203) and even the fall of Chancellor Bay (d. 1192). The last Bronze Age king of Ugarit, Ammurapi, was a contemporary of the last-known Hittite king, Suppiluliuma II. The exact dates of his reign are unknown.

A letter by the king is preserved on one of the clay tablets found baked in the conflagration of the destruction of the city. Ammurapi stresses the seriousness of the crisis faced by many Levantine states due to attacks. In response to a plea for assistance from the king of Alasiya, Ammurapi highlights the desperate situation Ugarit faced in letter RS 18.147:

Eshuwara, the senior governor of Cyprus, responded in letter RS 20.18:

The ruler of Carchemish sent troops to assist Ugarit, but Ugarit was sacked. Letter RS 19.011 (KTU 2.61) sent from Ugarit following the destruction said:

This quote is frequently interpreted as "the degraded one ..." referring to the army being humiliated, destroyed, or both. The letter is also quoted with the final statement "Mayst thou know it"/"May you know it" repeated twice for effect in several later sources, while no such repetition appears to occur in the original.

The destruction levels of Ugarit contained Late Helladic IIIB ware, but no LH IIIC (see Mycenaean Greece). Therefore, the date of the destruction is important for the dating of the LH IIIC phase. Since an Egyptian sword bearing the name of Pharaoh Merneptah was found in the destruction levels, 1190 was taken as the date for the beginning of the LH IIIC. A cuneiform tablet found in 1986 shows that Ugarit was destroyed after the death of Merneptah. It is generally agreed that Ugarit had already been destroyed by the 8th year of Ramesses III, 1178. Letters on clay tablets that were baked in the conflagration caused by the destruction of the city speak of attack from the sea, and a letter from Alashiya (Cyprus) speaks of cities already being destroyed by attackers who came by sea.

There is clear evidence that Ugarit was destroyed in some kind of assault, though the exact assailant is not known. In one residential area called the Ville sud, thirty two arrowheads were found scattered throughout the area with 12 of the arrowheads were found on the streets and in the open spaces. Along with the arrowheads, two lance heads, four javelin heads, five bronze daggers, one bronze sword, and three bronze pieces of armor were scattered throughout the houses and streets suggesting a fight took place in this residential neighborhood. An additional twenty five arrowheads were also recovered scattered around the Centre de la ville all of which suggests the city was burnt by an assault not by an earthquake. At the city of Emar, on the Euphrates, at some time between 1187–1175 only the monumental and religious structures were targeted for destruction while the houses appear to have been emptied, abandoned and were not destroyed with the monumental structures which suggests that the city was burned by attackers even though no weapons were recovered.

While certain cities such as Ugarit and Emar were destroyed at the end of the Late Bronze Age, there are several others which were not destroyed even though they erroneously appear on most maps of destruction from the end of the Late Bronze Age. No evidence of destruction has been found at Hama, Qatna, Kadesh, Alalakh, and Aleppo, while for Tell Sukas, archaeologists only found some minor burning on some floors likely indicating that the town was not burned to the ground around 1200 BC.

The West Semitic Arameans eventually superseded the earlier Amorites and people of Ugarit. The Arameans, together with the Phoenicians and the Syro-Hittite states came to dominate most of the region demographically; however, these people, and the Levant in general, were also conquered and dominated politically and militarily by the Middle Assyrian Empire until Assyria's withdrawal in the late 11th century, although the Assyrians continued to conduct military campaigns in the region. However, with the rise of the Neo-Assyrian Empire in the late 10th century, the entire region once again fell to Assyria.

These sites in Syria show evidence of the collapse:
 Ugarit
 Tell Sukas
 Kadesh
 Qatna
 Hama
 Alalakh
 Aleppo
 Emar

Southern Levant
Egyptian evidence shows that from the reign of Horemheb (ruled either 1319 or 1306 to 1292), wandering Shasu were more problematic than the earlier Apiru. Ramesses II (r. 1279–1213) campaigned against them, pursuing them as far as Moab, where he established a fortress, after a near defeat at the Battle of Kadesh. During the reign of Merneptah, the Shasu threatened the "Way of Horus" north from Gaza. Evidence shows that Deir Alla (Succoth) was destroyed, likely by an earthquake, after the reign of Queen Twosret (r. 1191–1189) though the date of this destruction appears to be much later dating to roughly 1150.

There is little evidence that any major city or settlement in the southern Levant was destroyed around 1200. At Lachish, The Fosse Temple III was ritually terminated while a house in Area S appears to have burned in a house fire as the most severe evidence of burning was next to two ovens while no other part of the city had evidence of burning. After this though the city was rebuilt in a grander fashion than before. For Megiddo, most parts of the city did not have any signs of damage and it is only possible that the palace in Area AA might have been destroyed though this is not certain. While the monumental structures at Hazor were indeed destroyed, this destruction was in the mid-13th century long before the end of the Late Bronze Age began. However, many sites were not burned to the ground around 1200 including: Ashkelon, Ashdod, Tell es-Safi, Tel Batash, Tel Burna, Tel Dor, Tel Gerisa, Tell Jemmeh, Khirbet Rabud, Tel Zeror, and Tell Abu Hawam among others.

During the reign of Ramesses III, Philistines were allowed to resettle the coastal strip from Gaza to Joppa, Denyen (possibly the tribe of Dan in the Bible, or more likely the people of Adana, also known as Danuna, part of the Hittite Empire) settled from Joppa to Acre, and Tjekker in Acre. The sites quickly achieved independence, as the Tale of Wenamun shows.

Despite many theories which claim that trade relations broke down after 1200 in the southern Levant, there is ample evidence that trade with other regions continued after the end of the Late Bronze Age in the Southern Levant. Archaeologist Jesse Millek has shown that while the common assuption is that trade in Cypriot and Mycenaean pottery ended around 1200, trade in Cypriot pottery actually largely came to an end at 1300, while for Mycenaean pottery, this trade ended at 1250, and destruction around 1200 could not have affected either pattern of international trade since it ended before the end of the Late Bronze Age. He has also demonstrated that trade with Egypt continued after 1200. Archaeometallurgical studies performed by various teams have also shown that trade in tin, a non-local metal necessary to make bronze, did not stop or decrease after 1200, even though the closest source of the metal were modern Afghanistan, Kazakhstan, or perhaps even Cornwall, England. Lead from Sardinia was still being imported to the southern Levant after 1200 during the early Iron Age.

These sites in the Southern Levant show evidence of the collapse:
 Hazor
 Akko
 Megiddo
 Deir 'Alla (Sukkot)
 Bethel
 Beth Shemesh
 Lachish
 Ashdod
 Ashkelon

Greece

Destruction was heaviest at palaces and fortified sites, and none of the Mycenaean palaces of the Late Bronze Age survived (with the possible exception of the Cyclopean fortifications on the Acropolis of Athens). Thebes was one of the earliest examples of this, having its palace sacked repeatedly between 1300 and 1200 and eventually completely destroyed by fire. The extent of this destruction is highlighted by Robert Drews, who reasons that the destruction was such that Thebes did not resume a significant position in Greece until at least the late 12th century. Many other sites offer less conclusive causes; for example it is unclear what happened at Athens, although it is clear that the settlement saw a significant decline during the Bronze Age Collapse. While there is no evidence of remnants of a destroyed palace or central structure, a change in location of living quarters and burial sites demonstrates a significant recession. Furthermore, the increase in fortification at this site suggests much fear of the decline in Athens. Vincent Desborough asserts that this is evidence of later migrations away from the city in reaction to its initial decline, although a significant population did remain. It remains possible that this emigration from Athens was not flight from violence. Nancy Demand posits that environmental changes could have played an important role in the collapse of Athens. In particular Demand notes the presence of "enclosed and protected means of access to water sources at Athens" as evidence of persistent droughts in the region that could have resulted in a fragile reliance on imports.

Up to 90% of small sites in the Peloponnese were abandoned, suggesting a major depopulation. Again, as with many of the sites of destruction in Greece, it is unclear how a lot of this destruction came about. The city of Mycenae for example was initially destroyed in an earthquake in 1250 as evidenced by the presence of crushed bodies buried in collapsed buildings. However, the site was rebuilt only to face destruction in 1190 as the result of a series of major fires. There is a suggestion by Robert Drews that the fires could have been the result of an attack on the site and its palace; however, Eric Cline points out the lack of archaeological evidence for an attack. Thus, while fire was definitely the cause of the destruction, it is unclear what or who caused it. A similar situation occurred Tiryns in 1200 BC, when an earthquake destroyed much of the city including its palace. It is likely however that the city continued to be inhabited for some time following the earthquake. As a result, there is a general agreement that earthquakes did not permanently destroy Mycenae or Tiryns because, as is highlighted by Guy Middleton, "Physical destruction then cannot fully explain the collapse". Drews points out that there was continued occupation at these sites, accompanied by attempts to rebuild, demonstrating the continuation of Tiryns as a settlement. Demand suggests instead that the cause could again be environmental, particularly the lack of homegrown food and the important role of palaces in managing and storing food imports, implying that their destruction only stood to exacerbate the more crucial factor of food shortage. The importance of trade as a factor is supported by Spyros Iakovidis, who points out the lack of evidence for violent or sudden decline in Mycenae.

Pylos offers some more clues to its destruction, as the intensive and extensive destruction by fire around 1180 reflects the violent destruction of the city. There is some evidence of Pylos expecting a seaborne attack, with tablets at Pylos discussing "Watchers guarding the coast". Eric Cline rebuts the idea that this is evidence of an attack by Sea People, pointing out that the tablet does not say what is being watched for or why. Cline does not see naval attacks as playing a role in Pylos's decline. Demand, however, argues that, regardless of what the threat from the sea was, it likely played a role in the decline, at least in hindering trade and perhaps vital food imports.

The Bronze Age collapse marked the start of what has been called the Greek Dark Ages, which lasted roughly 400 years and ended with the establishment of Archaic Greece. Other cities, such as Athens, continued to be occupied, but with a more local sphere of influence, limited evidence of trade and an impoverished culture, from which it took centuries to recover.

These sites in Greece show evidence of the collapse:

 Teichos Dymaion (el)
 Pylos
 Nichoria
 Menelaion
 Tiryns
 Mycenae
 Thebes
 Lefkandi
 Iolkos
 Knossos
 Kydonia

Areas that survived

Mesopotamia
The Middle Assyrian Empire (1392–1056) had destroyed the Hurrian-Mitanni Empire, annexed much of the Hittite Empire and eclipsed the Egyptian Empire. At the beginning of the Late Bronze Age collapse, it controlled an empire stretching from the Caucasus mountains in the north to the Arabian peninsula in the south, and from Ancient Iran in the east to Cyprus in the west. However, in the 12th century, Assyrian satrapies in Anatolia came under attack from the Mushki (who may have been Phrygians) and those in the Levant from Arameans, but Tiglath-Pileser I (reigned 1114–1076 BC) was able to defeat and repel these attacks, conquering the attackers. The Middle Assyrian Empire survived intact throughout much of this period, with Assyria dominating and often ruling Babylonia directly, and controlling southeastern and southwestern Anatolia, northwestern Iran and much of northern and central Syria and Canaan, as far as the Mediterranean and Cyprus.

The Arameans and Phrygians were subjugated, and Assyria and its colonies were not threatened by the Sea Peoples who had ravaged Egypt and much of the East Mediterranean, and the Assyrians often conquered as far as Phoenicia and the East Mediterranean. However, after the death of Ashur-bel-kala in 1056, Assyria withdrew to areas close to its natural borders, encompassing what is today northern Iraq, northeastern Syria, the fringes of northwestern Iran, and southeastern Turkey. It still retained a stable monarchy, the best army in the world, and an efficient civil administration, enabling it to survive the Bronze Age Collapse intact. Assyrian written records remained numerous and the most consistent in the world during the period, and the Assyrians were still able to mount long range military campaigns in all directions when necessary. From the late 10th century, Assyria once more asserted itself internationally, and the Neo-Assyrian Empire grew to be the largest the world had yet seen.

The situation in Babylonia was very different. After the Assyrian withdrawal, it was still subject to periodic Assyrian (and Elamite) subjugation, and new groups of Semitic speakers such as the Arameans and Suteans (and in the period after the Bronze Age Collapse, Chaldeans also) spread unchecked into Babylonia from the Levant, and the power of its weak kings barely extended beyond the city limits of Babylon. Babylon was sacked by the Elamites under Shutruk-Nahhunte (c. 1185–1155), and lost control of the Diyala River valley to Assyria.

Egypt

While it survived the Bronze Age collapse, the Egyptian Empire of the New Kingdom era receded considerably in territorial and economic strength during the mid-twelfth century (during the reign of Ramesses VI, 1145 to 1137). Previously, the Merneptah Stele (c. 1200) spoke of attacks (Libyan War) from Putrians (from modern Libya), with associated people of Ekwesh, Shekelesh, Lukka, Shardana and Teresh (possibly Troas), and a Canaanite revolt, in the cities of Ashkelon, Yenoam and among the people of Israel. A second attack (Battle of the Delta and Battle of Djahy) during the reign of Ramesses III (1186–1155) involved Peleset, Tjeker, Shardana and Denyen.

The Nubian War, the First Libyan War, the Northern War and the Second Libyan War were all victories for Ramesses. Due to this, however, the economy of Egypt fell into decline and state treasuries were nearly bankrupt. By defeating the Sea People, Libyans, and Nubians, the territory around Egypt was safe during the collapse of the Bronze Age, but military campaigns in Asia depleted the economy. With his victory over the Sea People, Ramesses III stated, "My sword is great and mighty like that of Montu. No land can stand fast before my arms. I am a king rejoicing in slaughter. My reign is calmed in peace." With this claim, Ramesses implied that his reign was safe in the wake of the Bronze Age collapse.
 
Egypt’s withdrawal from the southern Levant was a protracted process lasting some one hundred years and was most likely a product of the political turmoil in Egypt proper. Many Egyptian garrisons or sites with an “Egyptian governor’s residence” in the southern Levant were abandoned without destruction including Dier el-Balah, Ashkelon, Tel Mor, Tell el-Far'ah (South), Tel Gerisa, Tell Jemmeh, Tel Masos, and Qubur el-Walaydah. Not all Egyptian sites in the southern Levant were abandoned without destruction. The Egyptian garrison at Aphek was destroyed, likely in an act of warfare at the end of the 13th century. The Egyptian gate complex uncovered at Jaffa was destroyed at the end of the 12th century between 1134-1115 based on C14 dates, while Beth-Shean was partially though not completely destroyed, possibly by an earthquake, in the mid-12th century.

Possible causes
Various theories have been put forward as possible contributors to the collapse, many of them mutually compatible.

Environmental

Volcanoes
Some Egyptologists have dated the Hekla 3 volcanic eruption in Iceland to 1159 BC and blamed it for famines under Ramesses III during the wider Bronze Age collapse. The event is thought to have caused a volcanic winter.

Other estimated dates for the Hekla 3 eruption range from 1021 (±130) to 1135 BC (±130) and 929 (±34). Other scholars prefer the neutral and vague "3000 BP".

Drought 
During what may have been the driest era of the Late Bronze Age, tree cover of the Mediterranean forest dwindled. Primary sources report that the era was marked by large-scale migration of people at the end of the Late Bronze Age.

In the Dead Sea region (The Southern Levant), the subsurface water level dropped by more than 50 meters during the end of the second millennium B.C.E. According to the geography of that region, for water levels to drop so drastically the amount of rain the surrounding mountains received would have been dismal.

Drought in the Nile Valley also may have contributed to the rise of the Sea Peoples and their sudden migration across the eastern Mediterranean. It was suspected that crop failures, famine and the population reduction that resulted from the lackluster flow of the Nile and the migration of the Sea Peoples led to New Kingdom Egypt falling into political instability at the end of the Late Bronze Age and well into the Iron Age.

Using the Palmer Drought Index for 35 Greek, Turkish and Middle Eastern weather stations, it was shown that a drought of the kind that persisted from January 1972 AD would have affected all of the sites associated with the Late Bronze Age collapse. Drought could have easily precipitated or hastened socioeconomic problems and led to wars.

In 2012 it was suggested that the diversion of midwinter storms from the Atlantic to north of the Pyrenees and the Alps, bringing wetter conditions to Central Europe but drought to the Eastern Mediterranean, was associated with the Late Bronze Age collapse. A 2023 study of tree rings of juniper trees growing in the region showed a change to drier conditions from the 13th century BC into the 12th century BC with three years consecutive drought in 1196, 1197 and 1198 BC. Analysis of multiple lines of paleoenvironmental evidence suggests climate change was one aspect associated with this period, but not the sole cause.

Pandemic
Recent evidence suggests the collapse of the cultures in Mycenaean Greece, Hittite Anatolia, and the Levant may have been precipitated or worsened by the arrival of an early and now-extinct strain of the Bubonic Plague that was brought from central Asia by the Sea Peoples or other migrating groups.

Cultural

Ironworking
The Bronze Age collapse may be seen in the context of a technological history that saw the slow spread of ironworking technology from present-day Bulgaria and Romania in the 13th and the 12th centuries BC.

Leonard R. Palmer suggested that iron, which is superior to bronze for weapons manufacturing, was in more plentiful supply and so allowed larger armies of iron users to overwhelm the smaller bronze-equipped armies that consisted largely of Maryannu chariotry.

Changes in warfare

Robert Drews argues for the appearance of massed infantry, using newly developed weapons and armour, such as cast rather than forged spearheads and long swords, a revolutionizing cut-and-thrust weapon, and javelins. The appearance of bronze foundries suggests "that mass production of bronze artefacts was suddenly important in the Aegean". For example, Homer uses "spears" as a metonym for "warriors".

Such new weaponry, in the hands of large numbers of "running skirmishers", who could swarm and cut down a chariot army, would destabilize states that were based upon the use of chariots by the ruling class. That would precipitate an abrupt social collapse as raiders began to conquer, loot and burn cities.

General systems collapse

A general systems collapse has been put forward as an explanation for the reversals in culture that occurred between the Urnfield culture of the 13th and 12th centuries BC and the rise of the Celtic Hallstatt culture in the 9th and 10th centuries BC. General systems collapse theory, pioneered by Joseph Tainter, proposes that societal collapse results from an increase in social complexity beyond a sustainable level, leading people to revert to simpler ways of life.

In the specific context of the Middle East, a variety of factorsincluding population growth, soil degradation, drought, cast bronze weapon and iron production technologiescould have combined to push the relative price of weaponry (compared to arable land) to a level unsustainable for traditional warrior aristocracies. In complex societies that were increasingly fragile and less resilient, the combination of factors may have contributed to the collapse.

The growing complexity and specialization of the Late Bronze Age political, economic, and social organization, in Carol Thomas and Craig Conant's phrase, together made the organization of civilization too intricate to reestablish piecewise when disrupted. That could explain why the collapse was so widespread and rendered the Bronze Age civilizations incapable of recovery. The critical flaws of the Late Bronze Age are its centralization, specialization, complexity, and top-heavy political structure. These flaws then were exposed by sociopolitical events (revolt of peasantry and defection of mercenaries), fragility of all kingdoms (Mycenaean, Hittite, Ugaritic, and Egyptian), demographic crises (overpopulation), and wars between states. Other factors that could have placed increasing pressure on the fragile kingdoms include piracy by the Sea Peoples interrupting maritime trade, as well as drought, crop failure, famine, or the Dorian migration or invasion.

See also

 Greek Dark Agesperiod following the Late Bronze Age collapse
 Iron Age Cold Epoch
 Middle Bronze Age migrations (ancient Near East)
 Migration Periodsimilar period preceding the Early Middle Ages
 Mycenology
 Third Intermediate Period of Egypta similar period in Egypt
 Late Harappan period, Indo-Aryan migrationsevents and periods connected to the end of the Bronze Age India

Notes

References

Sources

Further reading

 Fischer, Peter M. and Teresa Bürge, 2017. "Sea Peoples" Up-To-Date : New Research on Transformations in the Eastern Mediterranean in the 13th-11th Centuries Bce. Wien: Verlag der Österreichischen Akademie der Wissenschaften. http://www.jstor.org/stable/10.2307/j.ctt1v2xvsn.
 Killebrew  Ann E. and Gunnar Lehmann, 2013. The Philistines and Other "Sea Peoples" in Text and Archaeology. Atlanta: Society of Biblical Literature.
 Bachhuber, Christoph R. and Gareth Roberts, 2009. Forces of Transformation : The End of the Bronze Age in the Mediterranean : Proceedings of an International Symposium Held at St. John's College  University of Oxford  25-6th March 2006 Paperback ed. Oxford: Oxbow Books.
 
 Oren, Eliezer D. 2000. The Sea Peoples and Their World : A Reassessment. Philadelphia: University Museum.
 Ward, William A. and Martha Sharp Joukowsky, 1992. The Crisis Years : The 12th Century B.c. : From Beyond the Danube to the Tigris. Dubuque  Iowa: Kendall/Hunt Pub.

External links

NPR Throughline podcast: The Aftermath of Collapse: Bronze Age Edition (2021)

 
Ancient Near East
Collapse
Bronze Age Asia
12th century BC
Indo-European history
Iron Age
Prehistoric Asia
Societal collapse
Dark ages
Volcanic winters